Elin Emin oglu Suleymanov is  the Ambassador of the Republic of Azerbaijan to the United Kingdom and former Ambassador of Republic of Azerbaijan to the United States.

Early years
A career diplomat, Suleymanov was born in Baku, Azerbaijan. He has graduated with bachelor's degrees in Geography from Azerbaijan State University in 1989, in Political Geography from Moscow State University in Russia in 1992, Master's degree in Public Administration from University of Toledo in Ohio in 1994. He also holds a graduate degree from Fletcher School of Law and Diplomacy with emphasis on international security studies and public international law. He was the first Azerbaijani to study at Fletcher School. 
Before joining diplomatic service, Suleymanov worked with the United Nations High Commissioner for Refugees in Azerbaijan and at Open Media Research Institute in Prague in 1995-1997.

Diplomatic career
Having worked as the First Secretary and Press attaché at the Embassy of Azerbaijan in Washington, D.C., Suleymanov then served as the Senior Counselor at the Foreign Relations Department of the Presidential Administration of Azerbaijan Republic. On November 14, 2005 the President of the Republic of Azerbaijan Ilham Aliyev appointed Suleymanov Azerbaijan’s first Consul General to Los Angeles, California with the rank of Envoy Extraordinary and Plenipotentiary. As a Consul to 13 states, Suleymanov has played a big role in enhancing knowledge about Azerbaijan and building the relationship between his country and individual states.
On October 26, 2011 Suleymanov was appointed Ambassador of Azerbaijan Republic to the United States. Ten years later he was appointed ambassador to the UK.

Suleymanov is fluent in Azerbaijani, English, Russian, Turkish and Czech.

References

Living people
Ambassadors of Azerbaijan to the United States
The Fletcher School at Tufts University alumni
Baku State University alumni
Moscow State University alumni
University of Toledo alumni
Diplomats from Baku
1970 births